Jeffrey Lawrence Hemmerman (born 25 February 1955) is an English former footballer. A forward, he scored 77 goals in 257 league games in a ten-year career in the Football League with Hull City, Scunthorpe United, Port Vale, Portsmouth, and Cardiff City. He was promoted out of the Fourth Division with Portsmouth in 1979–80, and then won promotion out of the Third Division with Cardiff City in 1982–83.

Career
Hemmerman came through the youth ranks at Hull City as Terry Neill's "Tigers" ended the 1973–74 season in ninth place in the Second Division, and then went on to finish the 1974–75 season in eighth place under the stewardship of John Kaye. He was loaned out to Scunthorpe United in the 1975–76 campaign, and scored one goal in five Fourth Division games at the Old Showground. He was Hull's top-scorer in the 1976–77 season with seven goals. In total, he scored ten goals in 59 league games during his four seasons at Boothferry Park.

Hemmerman signed with Roy Sproson's Port Vale in June 1977. He scored on his debut on 20 August, converting a penalty in a 3–1 defeat to Chesterfield at Vale Park. Two weeks later he claimed both goals in a 2–1 win over Lincoln City, but fell out of the first team picture and ended the 1977–78 season with six goals in 20 league and cup appearances as the "Valiants" were relegated out of the Third Division under Bobby Smith's stewardship.

He moved to Jimmy Dickinson's Portsmouth on a free transfer in May 1978. Hemmerman finished as top-scorer in the 1978–79 campaign with 16 goals, as "Pompey" finished three places outside the Fourth Division promotion places. Under the stewardship of new boss Frank Burrows, promotion was secured with a fourth-place finish in 1979–80. They missed out on a second successive promotion by six points and three places in 1980–81, but then dropped back into mid-table in 1981–82. Hemmerman scored 40 goals in 123 league games during his spell at Fratton Park.

He moved to Len Ashurst's Cardiff City and was the "Bluebirds" top-scorer in the 1982–83 Third Division promotion season with 26 goals in all competitions. However, he suffered a severe knee ligament injury against Bristol Rovers, and though he attempted a comeback the following year he struggled to regain form and fitness and subsequently retired from professional football at Ninian Park. He was awarded a testimonial in December 1984 when Cardiff played Aston Villa.

Post-retirement
After retiring, he trained as a physiotherapist and worked for Cardiff City before setting up his own rehabilitation clinic in Newport.

Career statistics
Source:

Honours
Portsmouth
Football League Fourth Division fourth-place promotion: 1979–80

Cardiff City
Football League Third Division second-place promotion: 1982–83

References

1955 births
Living people
Footballers from Kingston upon Hull
English footballers
Association football forwards
Hull City A.F.C. players
Scunthorpe United F.C. players
Port Vale F.C. players
Portsmouth F.C. players
Cardiff City F.C. players
English Football League players
Cardiff City F.C. non-playing staff
Association football physiotherapists